Fuse is the eighth studio album by New Zealand-born Australian country music singer Keith Urban. It was released on 10 September 2013 via Hit Red and Capitol Records Nashville. The album includes features from Miranda Lambert and Eric Church and has spawned six singles, four of which have topped the newly introduced US Billboard Country Airplay chart, making it his first album to produce four chart-topping singles.

Upon its release, the album debuted atop both the US Billboard 200 and the Billboards Top Country Albums charts, becoming Urban's fourth (non-consecutive) number one album on the latter. It received generally positive reviews from contemporary music critics, who complimented the more diverse musical styles explored on the songs.

Background
Regarding the sound of the new album, Urban said during an interview with Rolling Stone that "[he] just wanted to see how far [he] could go before it's not [him]." He also said he was inspired by U2's album Achtung Baby. "Bono said, [Achtung Baby] had to be the sound of [U2] chopping down The Joshua Tree, which I thought was great," he added. "That's where I found myself at. I can keep making the same record, but I don't want to do that." The album cover was revealed on 1 August 2013.

Singles
The album's lead single "Little Bit of Everything", written by Brad and Brett Warren (both of The Warren Brothers) along with Kevin Rudolf, was released on 14 May 2013. This song reached number one on the US Billboard Country Airplay chart in September 2013, as did "We Were Us", which was released as the album's second international single. in September 2013. "Shame" was released as the second single in Australia and New Zealand only in August 2013. The third international single, "Cop Car" was released in January 2014. The fourth international single, "Somewhere in My Car", was released on 23 June 2014. That song also reached number one on the Country Airplay chart late that year. The fifth international single, "Raise 'Em Up" is duet with Eric Church. it was released on 26 January 2015, and became the fourth (of the five North American releases) to top the Country Airplay chart in May 2015.

Critical reception

Fuse garnered generally positive reception from music critics to critique the album. At Metacritic, the album was assigned a weighted average score based upon selected mainstream critics reviews and ratings, which based upon four reviews, the album has a Metascore of a 74. Country Weeklys Bob Paxman said that the release "mesh[ed] Keith's usual blend of pop and country with some R&B touches and even some New Age-y sounds." He praised the variety of sounds and thought that the vocals were more "prominent than on Urban's previous albums." Will Hermes of Rolling Stone highlighted "What is surprising, though, is how unforced and fun the record sounds", and this was because "[s]ometimes, leaving your zone is the best way to find yourself." At Allmusic, Thom Jurek wrote that "For all the piecemeal recording, technological obsession and sheer ambition on the Fuse, Urban manages to fashion it all into a [mostly] working whole and maintain his identity as a contemporary country artist, even as he reaches for the mainstream pop fences."

Jerry Shirver of USA Today suggested that "Deleting generic material would have made the gems pop more, but that's minor since there are plenty of keepers". At The Oakland Press, Gary Graff told that "Fuse does lean a bit heavy on same-sounding arrangements (gentle verses swelling into bombastic choruses) but the songs are consistently strong, and Urban's performances on both guitar and vocals – including duets with Miranda Lambert ('We Were Us') and Eric Church ('Raise 'Em Up') – certainly help the new sonic approaches go down easy." Glenn Gamboa of Newsday said that the album was "filled with plenty of pleasant surprises. The biggest one, though, is how high Urban raised his ambitions and then delivered impressively on them." At Edmonton Journal, Amanda Ash stated that the release was "a thrill that's for sure, although the sentimental ups and downs may be hard on those with pop-sensitive stomachs."

At The New York Times, Jon Caramanica wrote a mixed review for the album, and evoked that "[t]he words are working hard here, and the music is, too, but Mr. Urban is gliding through, barely quaking at all." Melinda Newman at HitFix affirmed that even though Urban "plays beyond country's confines on a few tracks, most tunes hew closely to what the faithful have come to love: mid-tempo tunes anchored by banjo or guitar and Urban’s instantly recognizable vocals." Bobby Peacock of Roughstock praised the variety of production and songwriting, saying of the latter that some of the songs "ha[d] different details and/or phrasing than his usual songs." He also wrote that "All of the changes [were] just right, fitting into his signature sound while offering something new and creative at every turn." At The Montreal Gazette, Bernard Perusse wrote that the album "[was] mind-numbingly predictable arena pop-rock" and that "[e]very singsong chorus, every wailing guitar solo and every heartland lyric sounds so written by committee that it’s almost impossible to tell one radio-friendly track from the other."

Commercial performance
During its first week of release, Fuse sold over 98,000 copies in the United States after debuting at number one both on the US Billboard 200 and Top Country Albums charts. As of April 2016, the album has sold over 478,000 copies in the US. The album was certified Platinum by the RIAA on 14 April 2017 for a million combined units of sales, tracks and streams.

The album also debuted at number one in both Canada and Australia and peaked within the Top 10 in the United Kingdom. It is Urban's second album to chart in his native New Zealand, after 2012's The Story So Far.

Track listing

Personnel
Compiled from liner notes.

"Somewhere in My Car"
J. Bonilla – programming
Dann Huff – electric guitar, acoustic guitar
Tony Lucido – bass guitar
Matt Mahaffey – keyboards, drums
Russell Terrell – background vocals
Keith Urban – all vocals, ganjo, electric guitar, slide guitar, EBow, piano
"Even the Stars Fall 4 U"
Jake Sinclair – bass guitar, programming, keyboards, percussion
Mark Stepro – drums
Keith Urban – all vocals, acoustic guitar, electric guitar, ganjo, mandolin, percussion
Butch Walker – background vocals, acoustic guitar, electric guitar, percussion, keyboards, programming
Stephanie Wu – fiddle
"Cop Car"
Zach Crowell – programming, electric guitar, acoustic guitar, bass guitar, piano, percussion, synthesizer, background vocals
John Fields – bass guitar
Devin Malone – dobro, pedal steel guitar, electric guitar
Chris McHugh – drums
Russell Terrell – background vocals
 Keith Urban – all vocals, electric guitar, EBow
"Shame"
Benny Blanco – instrumentation, programming
Ammar Malik – bass guitar
Stargate – instrumentation, programming
Keith Urban – ganjo, electric guitar
"Good Thing"
Mike Elizondo – programming, bass guitar, keyboards
 Keith Urban – all vocals, ganjo, electric guitar, acoustic guitar
"We Were Us"
Nathan Chapman – programming, bass guitar, acoustic guitar, keyboards
Miranda Lambert – lead vocals
Keith Urban – all vocals, electric guitar, acoustic guitar, ganjo
"Love's Poster Child"
Fred Eltringham – drums
Jay Joyce – baritone guitar, bass guitar, mandolin, programming
 Keith Urban – all vocals, ganjo, electric guitar, drums on verse 2
"She's My 11"
Ross Copperman – background vocals, piano, accordion, programming
Jerry Flowers – bass guitar
Matt Mahaffey – keyboards
Jaren Johnston – background vocals
Chris McHugh – drums
Keith Urban – all vocals, electric guitar, ganjo
"Come Back to Me"
 Keith Urban – all vocals, electric guitar, acoustic guitar
Butch Walker – background vocals, bass guitar, keyboards, programming
"Red Camaro"
Mike Elizondo – programming, bass guitar, keyboards, electric guitar
Caitlin Evanson – fiddle
 Keith Urban – all vocals, electric guitar, acoustic guitar, ganjo
"Little Bit of Everything"
Nathan Chapman – drum programming, synthesizer bass, ukulele, piano, keyboards
Kevin Rudolf – guitar riff on chorus
 Keith Urban – all vocals, ganjo, electric guitar, slide guitar, guitar solo
"Raise 'Em Up"
Nathan Chapman – programming, bass guitar, keyboards, background vocals
Eric Church – lead vocals
 Keith Urban – all vocals, electric guitar, acoustic guitar
"Heart Like Mine"
Jake Sinclair – bass guitar
Keith Urban – all vocals, piano, mandolin, acoustic guitar
Butch Walker – background vocals, keyboards, drums, percussion, programming
Patrick Warren – strings
"Black Leather Jacket"
Danny Rader – mandolin, bouzouki, accordion
Keith Urban – all vocals, acoustic guitar, ganjo
Butch Walker – background vocals, bass, drums, percussion, keyboards, programming
"Gonna B Good"
J. Bonilla – programming
Jerry Flowers – background vocals
Wes Hightower – background vocals
Dann Huff – electric guitar, bouzouki
Charlie Judge – synthesizer
Tony Lucido – bass guitar
Gene Miller – background vocals
 Keith Urban – all vocals, electric guitar, acoustic guitar, slide guitar, ganjo, bouzouki, baby sitar
"Lucky Charm"
Jared Champion – drums
Jay Joyce – electric guitar, acoustic guitar, bass guitar, Mellotron, programming
Keith Urban – all vocals, electric guitar, acoustic guitar

Charts

Weekly charts

Year-end charts

Singles

Notes
A^ "Shame" was released in Australia and New Zealand only as the second single from Fuse in August 2013.

Certifications

References

External links
 

2013 albums
Keith Urban albums
Capitol Records albums